Patrick Bell (12 May 1799 – 22 April 1869) was a Church of Scotland minister and inventor.

Biography
Born in the rural parish of Auchterhouse in Angus, Scotland, into a farming family, Bell chose to study divinity at the University of St Andrews. He was Carmyllie parish minister from 1843 until his death.

The Reaping Machine

Bell invented the reaping machine while working on his father's farm. His interest in mechanics led him to work on a horse powered mechanical reaper for speeding up the harvest. In 1828 his machine was used with success on his father's farm and others in the district.

This reaping machine used a revolving 12 vane reel to pull the crop over the cutting knife, that was made from triangular reciprocating blades over fixed triangular blades.  A canvas conveyor moved the grain and stalks to the side in a windrow.  This machine was pushed by livestock and ran on 2 wheels.

Bell never sought a patent for his reaping machine. Being a man of God, he believed his invention should benefit all mankind. Therefore, he never made any financial gain from its success throughout the world.

On May 3, 1831, a patent was issued in the United States to William Manning for the reaper of essentially the same design. On December 31, 1833, a similar cutter patent was issued to Obed Hussey. A vibrating cutter was patented by Cyrus McCormick on June 21, 1834. McCormick with his brothers mass-produced the machines and developed what became the International Harvester Company.

References

External links
http://www.auchterhouse.com/history/pbell.htm 
https://web.archive.org/web/20081006144523/http://www.angus.gov.uk/history/features/people/patrickbell.htm
http://www.cornways.de/hi_combine.html
http://nms.scran.ac.uk/database/record.php?scache=5cryr2dbs0&searchdb=scran&usi=000-100-044-206-C

1799 births
1869 deaths
19th-century Ministers of the Church of Scotland
Scottish inventors